The women's 57 kg competition at the 2018 European Judo Championships was held on 26 April at the Expo Tel Aviv.

Results

Finals

Repechage

Pool A

Pool B

Pool C

Pool D

References

External links
 

W57
European Judo Championships Women's Lightweight
European W57